The 1997 Japanese Grand Prix (officially known as the XXIII Fuji Television Japanese Grand Prix) was a Formula One motor race held on 12 October 1997 at the Suzuka Circuit, Suzuka. It was the 16th and penultimate race of the 1997 Formula One season. The 53-lap race was won by Michael Schumacher for the Ferrari team after starting from second position. Heinz-Harald Frentzen finished second in a Williams, and Eddie Irvine third in the other Ferrari. Irvine led much of the race before moving over to assist Schumacher's championship battle by blocking Drivers' Championship leader Jacques Villeneuve.

Villeneuve started on pole position in a Williams car. Before the race, it emerged that Villeneuve had been put to the back of the grid, for having ignored waved yellow flags on two consecutive laps during a practice session for the race. Williams appealed and Villeneuve started from the pole. He drove a conservative race to finish 5th, gaining two points. After the race, Williams withdrew their appeal, meaning he lost the two points he originally earned. Schumacher's win put him in front of Villeneuve in the championship on 78 points, with Villeneuve on 77 points. However, as a result of Frentzen finishing second, Williams clinched the Constructors' Championship as Ferrari could not pass their points total with only one race remaining. This race was the last for Gianni Morbidelli.

Report

Practice and qualifying 
For each race in the 1997 Formula One season there were four practice sessions; two sessions on Friday and two sessions on Saturday morning. The practice sessions on Friday lasted an hour and the practice sessions on Saturday lasted 45 minutes.

In the first practice session on Saturday morning, an incident occurred 30 minutes into the session. Jos Verstappen in a Tyrrell car pulled over to the side of the track with a fuel pick-up problem. The track marshals as a result waved yellow flags meaning that drivers should slow down at that part of the track. Despite the yellow flags, nine drivers, including Michael Schumacher and Jacques Villeneuve, never slowed down. Villeneuve in the process, set his fastest time of the session on that lap.

Villeneuve set pole position with a time of 1:36.071, half a tenth faster than Schumacher, who was second in the Ferrari setting a time of 1:36.133. Schumacher's team-mate, Eddie Irvine, qualified third, four-tenths behind Villeneuve. McLaren driver Mika Häkkinen rounded out the top four, only three thousands of a second behind Irvine. The Benetton drivers were fifth and seventh; Gerhard Berger ahead of Jean Alesi. Heinz-Harald Frentzen in a Williams split the two in sixth, six-tenths behind Villeneuve.

Classification

Qualifying

Race

Championship standings after the race
Note, only the top five positions are included for both sets of standings.

Drivers' Championship standings

Constructors' Championship standings

References

Japanese Grand Prix
Japanese Grand Prix
Grand Prix
Japanese Grand Prix